The Censored Eleven is a group of Looney Tunes and Merrie Melodies cartoons originally produced and released by Warner Bros. that were withheld from syndication in the United States by United Artists (UA) since 1968. UA owned the distribution rights to the Associated Artists Productions library at that time, and decided to pull these 11 cartoons from broadcast because the use of ethnic stereotypes in the cartoons, specifically African stereotypes, was deemed too offensive for contemporary audiences. The ban has been continued by UA and the successive owners of the pre-August 1948 Looney Tunes/Merrie Melodies. , these shorts have not been officially broadcast on television and have only been exhibited theatrically by Warner Bros. once (in 2010, see below for more details) since their withdrawal. They have turned up, however, on low-cost VHS and DVD collections.

Background 
The cartoon output of Warner Bros. during its most active period even sometimes had censorship problems more complex in some respects than those of features. Unlike feature films, which were routinely censored in the script, the animated shorts were passed upon only when completed, which made the producers exceptionally cautious as to restrictions. In 1983, director Chuck Jones commented on the television censorship of the Warner Bros. cartoons: "I don't like to see the films cut at all. [...] They make some cuts that are so arbitrary and stupid, you can't believe it." Independent stations that once ran the syndicated Warner Bros. cartoons never had the same type of censorship as first-run networks such as ABC and CBS did for the cartoons. Some stations even owned syndication rights to "a few they consider[ed] racially stereotypical", but never ran them.

When Ted Turner obtained the rights to the pre-1950 Warner Bros. library from MGM/UA Entertainment Co. in 1986, he vowed that he would not distribute or air any cartoons from the Censored Eleven. They were the only cartoons in this package not to be featured in the LaserDisc series The Golden Age of Looney Tunes.

Censored Eleven list 
The cartoons in the Censored Eleven are:

Friz Freleng directed the largest number of cartoons on the list with four, followed by Tex Avery with three, and Bob Clampett with only two. Rudolf Ising, like Jones, only has one cartoon on the list. Angel Puss is the only cartoon directed by Jones on the list, as well as the only Looney Tunes cartoon on the list. Hittin' the Trail to Hallelujah Land is the only black-and-white short on the list, and the only cartoon to star Piggy. Goldilocks and the Jivin' Bears is the only cartoon on this list not to be produced by Leon Schlesinger. It is also the first to be produced by an uncredited Eddie Selzer. All This and Rabbit Stew is the only Bugs Bunny cartoon on the list. The Isle of Pingo Pongo is also the only Elmer Fudd cartoon on the list. The other 8 are one-shot cartoons.

Other censored Looney Tunes shorts 
Several more cartoons have been removed from circulation since the list was created, but have not been added to the Censored Eleven list. These include numerous World War II-era cartoons involving the Japanese, such as Bugs Bunny Nips the Nips and Tokio Jokio.

Some cartoons that remain in the release have been heavily edited to remove stereotypical depictions of African Americans, including the Gone With the Wind satire Confederate Honey. Fresh Hare is often shorn of a scene in which a blackface Bugs and Elmer sing Camptown Races. Friz Freleng's cartoon September in the Rain features some stereotyped black characters but is not entirely focused on them, so has occasionally reappeared without them. An early Porky Pig cartoon with stereotypical depictions of black people is Porky's Railroad (also 1937).

A number of shorts are rarely shown owing to stereotyping and potentially offensive characterizations of Native Americans. They include The Hardship of Miles Standish (1940), Slightly Daffy (1944), A Feather in His Hare (1948), Nothing But the Tooth (1948), Tom Tom Tomcat (1953), Horse Hare (1960), Hocus Pocus Powwow (1968), and Injun Trouble (1969). The 1946 short Book Revue is withdrawn from Cartoon Network and Boomerang and is omitted from its app due to the brief sequence showing various male characters suggestively reacts towards a sultry Native stripper.

Public awareness in the 21st century 
As the 20th century came to a close, the Censored Eleven cartoons became better known as several animation historians drew attention to their existence. The publicity these films received from various animation discussion websites eventually led to an article in The New York Times. This is in part due to the advent of the Internet, and the rise of YouTube has brought some of the Censored Eleven to light.

In February 2010, as part of a press release for the first annual TCM Classic Film Festival, it was announced that the Censored Eleven were to receive a special screening sourced from restored 35mm film prints. This special presentation was put together by George Feltenstein, vice president of Warner Bros.' classic film catalog. Film historian Donald Bogle, who has six books published to his credit on the subject of African American stereotypes in film, agreed to host the event for the festival. On April 24, 2010, a total of eight of the Censored Eleven were screened at the Egyptian Theater in Hollywood; the three that were not shown at the event were Jungle Jitters, All This and Rabbit Stew and Angel Puss. According to animation historian Jerry Beck, this event was a way for Warner Bros. to test the waters for a potential DVD release of these controversial films, possibly through the Warner Archives collection.

Rejected attempt 
At the New York Comic Con in October 2010, Warner Bros. confirmed that it would be releasing the Censored Eleven completely uncut on DVD through the Warner Archives program sometime in 2011. On December 1, 2010, animation expert Jerry Beck announced on the Shokus Internet Radio call-in talk program Stu's Show that there were plans for a general traditional retail release and not via the Warner Archives. It would be a high-class release featuring all of the Censored Eleven and other rare cartoons restored, with some bonus materials. However, no further news of a DVD release has surfaced since. In 2016, Jerry Beck stated that the transfers had been done, but the DVD release had been delayed indefinitely due to declining sales of previous Looney Tunes Platinum Collection releases. In 2018, according to a user on Shadow and Act who spoke to Beck, the plans to release the cartoons had been scrapped due to changing cultural sensitivities, as well as the poor sales of classic cartoon DVDs.

See also 
 Song of the South
 Scrub Me Mama with a Boogie Beat
 Little Black Sambo
 Lulu's Birthday Party
 His Mouse Friday
 Standards & Practices
 Dumbo

Notes

References 
 Look staff (January 17, 1939). "Hollywood Censors Its Animated Cartoons", Look. Retrieved May 27, 2011.
 Fanton, Ben (December 24, 1983). "Bugs Bunny: A Peaceful Rabbit?", TV Guide. Retrieved May 27, 2011.

External links 

 The Censored Eleven at Golden Age Cartoons
 Did Bugs Bunny appear in a racist cartoon during World War II? – The Straight Dope
 Most Popular Censored Movies and TV Shows – IMDb

 
Looney Tunes shorts
Looney Tunes
Merrie Melodies
Merrie Melodies short films
Film censorship in the United States
Film controversies in the United States
Articles containing video clips
Self-censorship
Film controversies
Race-related controversies in animation
Race-related controversies in film